Cerro Moneda is a town located in Oaxaca.

Populated places in Oaxaca